Poses Hiliades Kalokairia is the second extended play by Greek singer Demy, released in Greece on 6 July 2012 by Panik Records. The album has peaked at number 1 on the Greek Albums Chart. She released the single as a digital download on 6 June 2012. The song also peaked at number 1 on the Greek Singles Chart.

Track listing

Charts

EWeekly charts

Release history

References

2012 EPs
Greek-language albums
Demy (singer) albums